Louis De Marquevic (1896 – 7 May 1973) was a French painter. His work was part of the painting event in the art competition at the 1948 Summer Olympics.

References

1896 births
1973 deaths
20th-century French painters
20th-century French male artists
French male painters
Olympic competitors in art competitions
Painters from Paris